Pierre Lees-Melou (born 25 May 1993) is a French professional footballer who plays as an attacking midfielder for  club Brest.

Career

Dijon
He played 16 games (split equally between starts and substitute appearances) as they earned promotion from Ligue 2 in his first season, while also playing in the fifth division with the reserve team. He scored his first two professional goals in April in wins over Clermont and Paris FC, and assisted the opening goal against Ajaccio that earned promotion on the final day.

In the 2016–17 Ligue 1, Lees-Melou scored 7 goals in 32 games as the team survived in 16th place. On 27 August, he came off the bench to score the final goal of a 4–2 comeback win at home to Lyon.

Nice
In June 2017, Lees-Melou signed a four-year deal with Nice, worth around €5 million. He made his debut on 26 July, starting in the third qualifying round of the UEFA Champions League, a 1–1 home draw with Ajax. After being eliminated in the play-offs by Napoli, the team competed in the UEFA Europa League, and he played all but one game in a run to the last 32.

In September 2020, having played over 100 games for Nice, Lees-Melou's contract was extended for one year. His four season-stay ended with 140 games and 18 goals.

Norwich City
On 13 July 2021, Lees-Melou signed a three-year deal with Norwich City for a fee of under £4 million, ahead of the team's return to the Premier League. He scored his first goal the following 10 April, opening a 2–0 home win over relegation rivals Burnley; after the game, striker Teemu Pukki said that he would be crucial for the rest of the season.

Brest 
On 23 July 2022, Lees-Melou signed for Ligue 1 side Brest on a three-year contract with an option for a further year. Norwich City received a reported €2.3 million transfer fee and a 10% sell-on clause.

Career statistics

References

External links

 
 Pierre Lees-Melou at foot-national.com
 
 

1993 births
Living people
People from Langon, Gironde
Sportspeople from Gironde
French footballers
Association football midfielders
US Lège Cap Ferret players
Dijon FCO players
OGC Nice players
Norwich City F.C. players
Stade Brestois 29 players
Ligue 2 players
Ligue 1 players
Premier League players
French expatriate footballers
French expatriate sportspeople in England
Expatriate footballers in England
Footballers from Nouvelle-Aquitaine